is a Japanese manga written and illustrated by You Takumi. It is licensed in North America by Digital Manga Publishing, which released the manga through its imprint, Juné, on 22 September 2007.

Reception
Holly Ellingwood, writing for Active Anime, was impressed at the diversity of the stories in the anthology. Danielle Van Gorder, writing for Mania Entertainment, came to enjoy the "oddball characters" and "quirky humor" in the stories.

References

External links

Manga anthologies
2006 manga
Yaoi anime and manga
Digital Manga Publishing titles